The Directorate General of Mines Safety is an agency of the India which administers the provisions of the government of India Mines Act, 1952 and, the Rules and Regulations framed there under. As per  Constitution of India, occupational safety, welfare and health of workers employed in mines (coal, metalliferous and oil-mines) are the concern of the Central Government, under the Union Ministry of Labour & Employment. 

The directorate carries out the mandates of the Mine Act at all mining and mineral processing operations in the India, regardless of size, number of employees, commodity mined, or method of extraction.
 
The organization has its headquarters at Dhanbad (Jharkhand) and is headed by Director-General of Mines Safety.

Mission 
Their mission is of continuous improvement of ‘safety and health standards, practices and performances’ in mines and oil-fields of India.

They implement ‘pro-active safety and health strategies’, and continuously improve their processes. They ensure ‘effective use of resources’ and behavioral change in its personnel.

Safety, health, and welfare legislation
The directorate administers the following acts and regulations:
 The Mines Act, 1952
 Coal Mines Regulations, 1957
 The Metalliferous Mines Regulations, 1961
 Oil Mines Regulations-1984
 Mines Rules, 1955
 Mines Vocational Training Rules, 1966
 The Mines Rescue Rules, 1985
 Mines Creche Rules, 1966
 Electricity Act, 2003 
 Central Electricity Authority( Measures Relating to Safety and Electric Supply) Regulations, 2010
 Allied Legislations 
 Factories Act, 1948, India- Chapter III & IV
 Manufacture, storage & import of Hazardous Chemicals Rules, 1989 
 Under Environmental (Protection) Act, 1986 
 Land Acquisition (Mines) Act, 1895 
 The Coal Mines (Conservation & Development ) Act, 1974

References

See also
Mine Safety and Health Administration

Mining law and governance
Mine safety
Occupational safety and health organizations
Safety engineering organizations